Perry County Courthouse may refer to:

Perry County Courthouse (Arkansas), Perryville, Arkansas
Perry County Courthouse (Illinois), Pinckneyville, Illinois
Old Perry County Courthouse (Indiana), Rome, Indiana
Perry County Courthouse (Mississippi), New Augusta, Mississippi, a Mississippi Landmark
Perry County Courthouse (Missouri), Perryville, Missouri
Perry County Courthouse (Ohio), New Lexington, Ohio
Old Perry County Courthouse (Ohio), Somserset, Ohio
Perry County Courthouse (Pennsylvania), New Bloomfield, Pennsylvania
Perry County Courthouse (Tennessee), Linden, Tennessee